The Battle of Bordeaux is an informal name for the World Cup football match between Brazil and Czechoslovakia on 12 June 1938 in the Parc Lescure in Bordeaux, France, one of the quarter-finals of the 1938 World Cup finals. The match had a series of brutal fouls by both sides, due to the lax officiating of Hungarian referee Pál von Hertzka.

Overview
At the match, which also opened the rebuilt Stade du Parc Lescure, Brazil took the lead 1–0, with Czechoslovakia equalizing on a penalty kick for ball handling by Domingos da Guia. The Brazilian Zezé Procópio was sent off after fourteen minutes. The Brazilian Arthur Machado and the Czechoslovak Jan Říha were sent off just before full time. It was the first time that three players were sent off in a World Cup match, a record that was equaled at the Battle of Berne 1954 between Hungary and Brazil, and exceeded at the 2006 World Cup match between Portugal and Netherlands. Captain František Plánička and Oldřich Nejedlý from Czechoslovakia suffered a broken right arm and right leg respectively in the mayhem. Their teammate Josef Košťálek was injured in the stomach. The match was drawn 1–1 after 90 minutes of full-time, and a 30-minute extra time had to be played. Nejedlý had abandoned the game before the end of regulation time due to his injury, but Plánička stayed at the Czechoslovak goal in pain through the rest of the second half and the extra time. Three other Brazilians, including Leônidas and Perácio, also left the field with injuries.

The match eventually ended 1–1 after extra time, and had to be replayed 2 days later, with both teams having to field several reserves. Brazil won the replay 2–1, eliminating Czechoslovakia and advancing to semifinals, where they faced eventual champions Italy.

Match

Original match

Replay

Notes

References

External links 

1938 FIFA World Cup
Sport in Bordeaux
FIFA World Cup matches
1938
1938
Czech
Brawls in team sports
Brazil
June 1938 sports events
Nicknamed sporting events